Paul Gonzalez (born April 22, 1969) is an American baseball executive and former professional player. Currently the general manager of the Brisbane Bandits, he played professional baseball in the United States, Japan, Italy and Australia, and won a silver medal with the Australia national baseball team at the 2004 Olympics.

Playing career
A native of Fort Worth, Texas, Gonzalez attended Texas Christian University. In 1989, he played collegiate summer baseball with the Yarmouth–Dennis Red Sox of the Cape Cod Baseball League and was named a league all-star.

Gonzalez was picked up in the  amateur draft by the San Diego Padres and played for a variety of minor league teams including the High Desert Mavericks, Wichita Wranglers, Las Vegas Stars, Prince William Cannons, Abilene Prairie Dogs and the Birmingham Barons.

Gonzalez played in the Australian Baseball League and the International Baseball League of Australia for the Brisbane Bandits from  until  and Melbourne Monarchs in the 1998–1999 season. In total he made 227 appearances, boasting 48 home-runs and 168 RBI's, giving him a batting average of .304 and slugging .567.

In  Gonzalez led the Claxton Shield and Queensland Rams batting with an average of .476 and slugging .857.

By , he played for Orix BlueWave in Japan. In , he was part of the Australian Olympic baseball team, who achieved a Silver Medal in the baseball tournament at the Athens Olympics.

References

1969 births
Living people
American expatriate baseball players in Japan
American expatriate baseball players in Taiwan
Australian expatriate baseball players in Japan
Australian expatriate baseball players in Taiwan
Baseball players from Fort Worth, Texas
Baseball players at the 2000 Summer Olympics
Baseball players at the 2004 Summer Olympics
Birmingham Barons players
High Desert Mavericks players
Las Vegas Stars (baseball) players
Medalists at the 2004 Summer Olympics
Olympic baseball players of Australia
Olympic medalists in baseball
Olympic silver medalists for Australia
Orix BlueWave players
Prince William Cannons players
Spokane Indians players
Wichita Wranglers players
Yarmouth–Dennis Red Sox players